Ayaka Yamashita may refer to:
Ayaka Yamashita (footballer) (born 1995), Japanese footballer
Ayaka Yamashita (voice actress), Japanese voice actress
Ayaka Yamashita, victim of the Kobe child murders